The 1969 All-Southwest Conference football team consists of American football players chosen by various organizations for All-Southwest Conference teams for the 1969 NCAA University Division football season.  The selectors for the 1969 season included the Associated Press (AP).

All Southwest selections

Offense

Quarterbacks
 Chuck Hixson, SMU (AP-1)

Halfbacks
 Bill Burnett, Arkansas (AP-1)
 Jim Bertelsen, Texas (AP-1)
 Larry Stegent, Texas A&M (AP-1)

Fullbacks
 Steve Worster, Texas (AP-1)

Wide receivers
 Gary Hammond, SMU (AP-1)
 Cotton Speyrer, Texas (AP-1)

Tight ends
 Ross Brupbacher, Texas A&M (AP-1)

Tackles
 Bob McKay, Texas (AP-1)
 Bobby Wuensch, Texas (AP-1)

Guards
 Jerry Dossey, Arkansas (AP-1)
 James Ray, TCU (AP-1)

Centers
 Rodney Brand, Arkansas (AP-1)

Defense

Defensive ends
 Bill Atessis, Texas (AP-1)
 Mike DeNiro, Texas A&M (AP-1)
 Richard Campbell, Texas Tech (AP-1)

Defensive tackles
 Rick Kersey, Arkansas (AP-1)
 Lynn Odom, Texas A&M (AP-1)

Linebackers
 Glen Halsell, Texas (AP-1)
 Cliff Powell, Arkansas (AP-1)
 Bruce Portillo, SMU (AP-1)

Defensive backs
 Denton Fox, Texas Tech (AP-1)
 Terry Stewart, Arkansas (AP-1)
 Dave Elmendorf, Texas A&M (AP-1) (CFHOF)
 Pat Curry, SMU (AP-1)

Kicking specialists
 Jerry Don Sanders, Texas Tech (AP-1) (placekicker)
 Ed Marsh, Baylor (AP-1) (punter)

Key

See also
1969 College Football All-America Team

References

All-Southwest Conference
All-Southwest Conference football teams